Aculus gemmarum is a species of mite which causes galls on the buds of willows (Salix species). It was first described by Alfred Nalepa in 1892.

Description
The buds are enlarged and hairy, and the mites are found between the small distorted leaves on Salix aegyptiac, S. aurita, S. babylonica, S. caprea, S. cinerea, S. elaeagnos, S. matsudana, S. repens (and possibly on Salix herbacea and Salix triandra).

DistributionAculus gemmarum'' has been found in Finland, France, Germany, Great Britain, Italy and Sweden.

References

Eriophyidae
Animals described in 1892
Arachnids of Europe
Taxa named by Alfred Nalepa
Willow galls